The Pocasset River is a river in the U.S. state of Rhode Island. It flows . There are five dams along the river's length.

Course
The Pocasset River rises between Brown Avenue and Belfield Drive in Johnston. It continues in a southeasterly direction through Johnston and Cranston, to the city line with Warwick, where it converges with the Pawtuxet River.

Crossings
Below is a list of all crossings over the Pocasset River. The list starts at the headwaters and goes downstream.
Johnston
Belfield Drive
Interstate 295
Memorial Avenue
Hartford Avenue (U.S. 6A)
Johnston Plaza
Atwood Avenue
U.S. 6
Central Avenue
Morgan Avenue
Morgan Mill Road
Plainfield Street (RI 14)
Cranston
Pocasset Cemetery Access Road
Cranston Street
Bike Path
Dyer Avenue
Park Avenue (RI 12)
Reservoir Avenue (RI 2)
Garden City Drive
Pontiac Avenue

Tributaries
Dry and Simmons Brooks are the only two named tributaries of the Pocasset River, though there are many unnamed streams that also feed it.

See also
List of rivers in Rhode Island
Pawtuxet River

References
Maps from the United States Geological Survey

Rivers of Providence County, Rhode Island
Rivers of Rhode Island
Tributaries of Providence River